The Speedway Champions Cup was an annual motorcycle speedway competition that took place between 1986 and 1993, featuring the national champions of the sixteen participating nations. It was discontinued with the introduction of the Speedway Grand Prix in 1995.

The 1989 championship was held at Natschbach-Loipersbach and the winner was Jan O. Pedersen from	Denmark.

Results
May 25, 1989
 Natschbach-Loipersbach

References

Speedway Champions Cup
Champions Cup
Speedway Champions Cup